Agenda is the name given to a series of Australian television news and commentary programs, broadcast on Sky News Australia throughout the week. The Agenda series of bulletins serve as the channel's flagship program.

The series focuses on mainly political topics, and in each episode the host usually interviews a guest, and is then usually joined by either Sky News contributors or politicians from opposing sides of politics debating the issues of the day.

With the exception of Sunday Agenda and the Thursday episode of PM Agenda, the program is broadcast live from the Sky News studio at Parliament House in Canberra. The other programs are broadcast from the main Sky News centre in the Sydney suburb of Macquarie Park.

Lunchtime Agenda was ended on 29 May 2015, when it was replaced by To The Point co-hosted by Peter van Onslen and Kristina Keneally. Saturday Agenda ended in 2015, when its presenter David Lipson defected to the ABC and the format was eventually replaced by Pyne & Marles.

While the contemporary Australian Agenda debuted on 4 July 2010, the title had previously been used for a weekly interview program presented by John Gatfield in at least 2001. The edition rebranded as Sunday Agenda on 9 July 2016.

Current variations

Former variations

See also
 List of Australian television series

References

External links
Sky News Official site

`

2010s Australian television series
2020s Australian television series
Sky News Australia
Australian Sunday morning talk shows